

Medical physiology and metabolism